Picarones (or Picaron singular) are a Peruvian dessert that originated in Lima during the viceroyalty. It is somewhat similar to buñuelos, a type of doughnut brought to the colonies by Spanish conquistadors. Its principal ingredients are squash and sweet potato. It is served in a doughnut form and covered with syrup, made from chancaca (solidified molasses). It is traditional to serve picarones when people prepare anticuchos, another traditional Peruvian dish.

History
Picarones were created during the colonial period to replace buñuelos as buñuelos were too expensive to make. People started replacing traditional ingredients with squash and sweet potato. Accidentally, they created a new dessert that rapidly increased in popularity.

Picarones are mentioned by Ricardo Palma in his book Tradiciones Peruanas (literally Peruvian traditions). Picarones are also featured in traditional Latin American music and poetry.

This dessert is mentioned in the autobiographical memoirs Remembrances of thirty years (1810-1840) (Spanish: Recuerdos de treinta años (1810-1840)) by Chilean José Zapiola, who mentions that picarones were typically eaten in Plaza de Armas de Santiago (Chile) before 1810.

Gallery

See also
 List of doughnut varieties
 List of fried dough varieties  
 List of squash and pumpkin dishes

Sources
 Compton, M. D. April 20, 2004. Peruvian Traditions: Ricardo Palma’s Latin American Historic and Folkloric Tales. United States. AuthorHouse. 
  Plevisani, S. 2005. Dulce Pasión. Lima, Perú. Quebecor World Perú.
  Ada y Maricarmen. February, 1997. El Arte de la Repostería. Lima, Perú. Biblos

References

External links

 Recipe for Picarones

Doughnuts
Peruvian desserts
Street food
Squash and pumpkin dishes